Progress is a rural locality (a selo) in Kisak-Kainsky Selsoviet, Yanaulsky District, Bashkortostan, Russia. The population was 596 as of 2010. There are 8 streets.

Geography 
Progress is located 20 km west of Yanaul (the district's administrative centre) by road. Aybulyak is the nearest rural locality.

References 

Rural localities in Yanaulsky District